Archie White (born 5 August 1997) is an English professional rugby union player who plays as a flanker for Premiership Rugby club Harlequins. He is in a relationship with England and Harlequins player Jessica Breach.

References

External links
 Archie White Ultimate Rugby Profile

1997 births
Living people
English rugby union players
Harlequin F.C. players
Rugby union flankers
Rugby union players from Surrey